The Big 12 Conference Softball Defensive Player of the Year is a college softball award given to the Big 12 Conference's most outstanding defensive player. The award has been given annually from 2004 to 2012, and 2016 to present.

Winners

Winners by school

References

Awards established in 2004
Defensive
College softball conference trophies and awards in the United States